Uncial 0243 (in the Gregory-Aland numbering), is a Greek uncial manuscript of the New Testament. Paleographically it has been assigned to the 10th century.

Description 
The codex contains a part of the Pauline epistles, with text 1 Cor. 13:42 - 2 Cor. 13:13, on 7 parchment leaves (32.5 cm by 24 cm). The text is written in two columns per page, 48 lines per page, in uncial letters.

The Second Epistle to the Corinthians is complete.

Currently it is dated by the INTF to the 10th century.

The manuscript was added to the list of the New Testament manuscripts by Kurt Aland in 1963.

Text 

The Greek text of this codex is a representative of the Alexandrian text-type. Aland placed it in Category II.

In 1 Corinthians 15:47 it reads δευτερος ανθρωπος along with  א*, B, C, D, F, G, 33, 1739, it, vg, copbo eth. Other manuscripts read δευτερος ο κυριος (630, δευτερος ανθρωπος ο κυριος (אc, A, Dc, K, P, Ψ, 81, 104, 181, 326, 330, 436, 451, 614, 629, 1241, 1739mg, 1877, 1881, 1984, 1985, 2127, 2492, 2495, Byz, Lect), δευτερος ανθρωπος πνευματικος (𝔓46).

In 1 Corinthians 15:54 it lacks το φθαρτον τουτο ενδυσηται αφθαρσιαν και along with 088, 0121a, 1175, 1739;

In 2 Corinthians 11:14 it has reading ου θαυμα as have codices Sinaiticus, Vaticanus, Bezae, Augiensis, Boernerianus, Porphyrianus, Uncial 098, Minuscule 6, 33, 81, 326, 365, 630, 1175, 1739, 1881, 2464; the majority has the reading ου θαυμαστον (D2, Ψ, 0121a, Byz).

Location 
Currently the codex is housed at the Biblioteca Marciana, 983 (II, 181) in Venice.

See also 

 List of New Testament uncials
 Textual criticism
 Uncial 0121b

References

Further reading 
 

Greek New Testament uncials
10th-century biblical manuscripts